Beijing Securities (北京证券) was a defunct investment bank and brokerage firm founded in 1997 on the basis of merger and reorganization of Beijing Securities Co., Ltd. and Beijing Finance Securities Company. In 2006 it became UBS Securities.

It has served as underwriters for nearly seventy listed companies, including Yanjing Brewery, CITIC Guoan Information Industry, Beijing Urban Construction and Shougang Company and helped enterprises to raise more than RMB 6 billion through direct financing on capital market. The company ranked sixth among domestic securities firms in terms of underwriting volume of new shares.

The business scope of Beijing Securities include: securities underwriting and listing recommendation, securities brokerage, securities trading, asset management, securities investment and consultation as well as initiating securities investment funds and fund management companies.

The company had put forward the "Zhongguancun Strategy", that is, to take it as its core business to give support to the development of Zhongguancun Hi-tech Park, the so-called "Silicon Valley of China". Currently, Beijing Securities is studying, cultivating and recommending qualified hi-tech enterprises to get listed on the main or the second board market and participating in the construction of "Zhongguancun Sector". The company is also active in getting involved in the capital operation of the listed companies in Beijing and the hi-tech enterprises in Zhongguancun to promote the development of these companies. It is taking full advantage of corporate bonds, investment funds and asset securitization to raise capital for the construction of the Zhongguancun Hi-tech Park and the development of hi-tech enterprises.

Approved by China Securities Regulatory Commission, Beijing Securities Co., Ltd has increased its capitalization from RMB 850 million to RMB 1.551 million. The total number of shareholders of the company reached 21.

References

Companies based in Beijing
Financial services companies of China
Financial services companies established in 1997
Banks established in 1997
Financial services companies disestablished in 2006
Banks disestablished in 2006
Investment banks in China
Defunct financial services companies of China